Dead Cross is the debut self-titled studio album by American thrash metal/crossover band Dead Cross. It was released in August 2017 under Ipecac Recordings.

Tracklist

Personnel 
 Michael Crain – guitar
 Justin Pearson – bass
 Dave Lombardo – drums
 Mike Patton – vocals
 Gabe Serbian – vocals (track 2)

Charts

References

2017 albums